Lutetium(III) acetate is the acetate salt of lutetium with the chemical formula of Lu(CH3COO)3.

Preparation 

Lutetium(III) acetate can be prepared through neutralisation, where a lutetium salt reacts with acetic acid to produce lutetium acetate and water:
Lu2O3 + 6 CH3COOH → 2 Lu(CH3COO)3 + 3 H2O
Lu(OH)3 + 3 CH3COOH →  Lu(CH3COO)3 + 3 H2O

Lutetium(III) acetate also can be obtained by reacting lutetium oxide with gaseous acetic acid or 50% acetic acid solution.

Properties 

Lutetium(III) acetate is a water-soluble salt that forms colorless crystals. It forms crystalline hydrates in the form of Lu(CH3COO)3•nH2O, where n = 1 or 4.

Lutetium(III) acetate reacts with ammonium fluoride to produce lutetium fluoride:

Lu(CH3COO)3 + 3 NH4F → LuF3 + 3 CH3COONH4

The F− formed by the hydrolysis of fluoroborates (such as [BMIM]BF4) can also precipitate with Lu3+.

Reaction with phosphoric acid to produce lutetium phosphate:

Lu(CH3COO)3 + H3PO4 → LuPO4 + 3 CH3COOH

References 

Lutetium compounds
Acetates